The tenth season of the Teenage Mutant Ninja Turtles 1987 TV series was also its final season. Shredder and Krang return for a three part episode, and the Technodrome is still in Dimension X.

When the season aired, the interest for the Teenage Mutant Ninja Turtles had almost faded out. At the time, CBS was phasing out its Saturday-morning cartoon block and the 10th season is essentially a miniseries.

Episodes
 All eight tenth-season episodes were directed by Tony Love and written by Jeffrey Scott.

References

External links
TV Com

Teenage Mutant Ninja Turtles (1987 TV series) seasons
1996 American television seasons
Time travel in television
Fiction about black holes
1990s American television miniseries